Frederick Paul "Dutch" Schliebner (May 19, 1891 – April 15, 1975) was a German-born American professional baseball first baseman. He played for one season in Major League Baseball (MLB) for the Brooklyn Robins and St. Louis Browns.

Career
Schliebner was born in Berlin, Germany, in 1891. He started his professional baseball career in 1912 with the Illinois–Indiana–Iowa League's Springfield Senators. Schlieber bounced around the minor leagues for the rest of the decade, also playing in the Central Association, Western League, Texas League, and American Association. During that time, he had a batting average under .300 in every season except 1916, when he batted .310 with 16 home runs.

In 1922, Schliebner went to the Southern Association's Little Rock Travelers and batted a career-high .354. He led the league in hits (194) and was second in batting average. The following season, Schliebner made it to the major leagues with the Brooklyn Robins. He played 19 games for them in April and May before being traded to the St. Louis Browns, in exchange for Dutch Henry and cash. The Browns' Hall of Fame first baseman, George Sisler, was out the entire season with sinusitis which affected his vision, and Schliebner was his replacement. He batted .275 in his next 127 games.

Sisler returned to the team in 1924, and Schliebner returned to the minors. He played five more seasons in the American Association and Texas League before his professional baseball career ended in 1928. In 15 minor league seasons, he batted .286 and accumulated 2,053 hits.

Schliebner died in Toledo, Ohio, in 1975 and was buried in Toledo Memorial Park Cemetery.

References

External links

1891 births
1975 deaths
Major League Baseball first basemen
Major League Baseball players from Germany
Brooklyn Robins players
St. Louis Browns players
Springfield Senators players
Ottumwa Packers players
Monmouth Browns players
Clinton Pilots players
Omaha Rourkes players
Dallas Giants players
St. Paul Saints (AA) players
Dallas Marines players
Galveston Pirates players
Wichita Falls Spudders players
Little Rock Travelers players
Toledo Mud Hens players
Columbus Senators players
Beaumont Exporters players
German emigrants to the United States
Sportspeople from Berlin